Tafsir Ishraq al-Ma’ani is a commentary on the Qur'an (tafsir) in the English language by Indian Islamic scholar Syed Iqbal Zaheer, who was an editor of the Bangalore-based weekly Islamic magazine Young Muslim Digest. 

The tafsir discusses how the Qur'an was understood by those who received it: the Islamic prophet Muhammad, his immediate followers (sahabah), and the scholars of Islam in every age. It also presents useful notes, variant notes, variant opinions, anecdotes and legal points from commentaries old and new.

Tafsir Ishraq al-Ma’ani available in 14 volumes and total Pages is 4,680. Syed Iqbal Zaheer write tafsir in English language. after English other language translation's are not available.

Authors or books cited or quoted 

 Musnad by Ahmed ibn Hanbal.
 Kitab al-Fiqh 'ala Madhahib al-Arba'ah by Abdul Rahman al-Jaziri.
 Muhammad Nasiruddin Albani by Silsilah al-Ahadith al-sahiha.
 Al-Tafsir Al-Kabir, the Tafsir notes of Ibn Taymiyyah (d. 728 AH) collected by 'Abdul Rahman 'Umayrah.
 Ruh al Ma'ani Fi Tafsir Qur'an al Azim Wa al Sab' al Mathani by Shihab al Din Sayyid Mahmood Alusi (d. 1291 AH)
 The Message of the Qur'an by Muhammed Asad (d. 1412 AH)
 Sharh Sunan Abi Da'ud by Muhammad Shams al-Haq al-'Azimabadi.
 Futh al-Bari bi Sharh Sahih al-Bukhari by Hafiz Ahmed b. Ali ibn Hajr al-'Asqalani (d. 852 AH)
 Hussain by Ibrahim Zahran, edited by Tafsir ibn Kathir.
 Life of the Prophet by Muhammad ibn Ishaq.
 Jami' al Bayan Fi Tafsir al Qur'an by Ibn Jarir al-Tabari (d. 310 AH).
 Tafsir al Qur'an al Azim by 'Imad al Din Abul Fida Isma'il ibn 'Amr ibn Kathir (d. 774 AH).
 Al-Tafsir Al-Qayyim by Shamsuddin Muhammad (born Abi Bakr Ibn Qayyim al-Jawziyyah, d. 751 AH), collected by Muhammad Uways Al-Nadwi.
 Faid al-Qadir Sharh Jami' Saghir (of Jalaluddin Suyuti) by Muhammad 'Abdul Ra'uf al-Munawi.
 Lughat al-Qur'an (Urdu) by Maulana Abdul Rashid No'mani.
 Ma'arif al Qur'an by Mufti Muhammad Shafi'Deobandi.
 Holy Qur'an Translation and Commentary by Abdul Majid Daryabadi (English).
 Holy Quran Translation and Commentary by Abdul Majid Daryabadi (Urdu).
 Tafhim al-Qur'an by Sayyid Abul A'la Mawdudi (d. 1979 CE).
 Muwatta by Imam Malik ibn Anas.
 Sharh Sahih Muslim by Imam Sharfuddin Al-Nawawi (d. 261 AH)
 Al Jam'i Lil Ahkam al Qur'an by Abu 'Abdullah Muhammad ibn Ahmad al Ansari al Qurtubi (d. 671 AH)
 Mu'jam Mufradat al-Qur'an by al-Raghib al-Asfahani.
 Rawa'e' al-Bayan Tafsir Ayat al-Ahkam by Muhammad 'Ali Sabuni.
 Tafsir al Fakhr al Razi by Muhammad al-Razi Fakhr al Din ibn Dia al Din 'Umar (d. 604 AH).
 Safwatu al Tafsir by Muhammad 'Ali Sabuni.
 Al-Qur'an al-Karim by Shabbir Ahmed 'Uthmani.
 Adwa' al-Bayan, Fi Idahi Al-Qur'an bi 'al-Qur'an by Muhammad Al-Amin (born Muhammad Al-Mukhtar Al-Jakani Al-Shanqiti).
 Fi Zilal al-Qur'an by Sayyid Qutb (d. 1386 AH).
 Al-Fath al-Qadir by Muhammad ibn 'Ali Shawkani (d. 1255 AH).
 Sayyid Ibrahim by Fath al-Qadir of Shawkani.
 Bayan al Qur'an by Ashraf 'Ali Thanwi (d. 1361 AH).
 Tuhfah al-Ahwazi bi Sharh Jami' al-Tirmidhi by Muhammad ibn 'Abdul Rahman Mubarakpuri.
 The Glorious Koran, Meaning and Translation by Abdullah Yusuf Ali.
 Haqa'iq al-Tanzil Wa 'Uyun al-Aqawil Fi Wujuh at-Ta'wil by Abu al-Qasim Jarallah Mahmood (born 'Umar al-Zamakhshari, d. 538 AH).
 Al-Burhan Fi 'Ulum al-Qur'an by Badruddin Muhammad bin 'Abdullah al-Zarkashi.

References 

 

Ishraq Al-Ma'ani